Adenylyl cyclase type 1 is an enzyme that in humans is encoded by the ADCY1 gene.

This gene encodes a form of adenylyl cyclase expressed in the brain. A similar protein in mice is involved in pattern formation of the brain.

Function 

ADCY1 is a calmodulin-sensitive adenylyl cyclase. In terms of function, It may be involved in regulatory processes in the central
nervous system; specifically, it may play a role in memory acquisition and learning. It is inhibited by the G protein beta and gamma subunit complex.

References

External links

Further reading 

 
 
 
 
 
 
 
 
 
 
 
 
 
 
 

EC 4.6.1